Nathaniel Willis (1755–1831) was a publisher and editor in the late 18th century. He participated in the Boston Tea Party in 1773. He issued the Independent Chronicle (1776–1784) and the American Herald in Boston, Massachusetts, and worked for some years with Edward Eveleth Powars as "Powars & Willis."

"In 1784 he sold his interest in the "Independent Chronicle," and became one of the pioneer journalists of the unsettled West. He removed first to Winchester, Virginia, where he published a paper for a short time; then to Shepardstown, where he also published a paper; and thence in 1790 to Martinsburg, Virginia, where he founded the Potomac Guardian and edited it till 1796. In that year he went to Chillicothe, Ohio, and established the Scioto Gazette, the first newspaper in what was then known as the Northwestern Territory. He was printer to the government of the territory, and afterwards held an agency in the Post Office Department. He bought and cultivated a farm near Chillicothe, on which he ended his days April 1, 1831."

Willis married "Lucy Douglas, of New London, Connecticut;" children included Nathaniel Willis, also a newspaperman.

See also
 Independent Chronicle (Boston, Massachusetts), published by Willis
 American Herald, published by Willis
 John Morgan. A Vindication of his Public Character in the Station of Director-General of the Military Hospitals, and Physician in Chief to the American Army: Anno 1776, published by Powars and Willis

References

External links

 WorldCat. Willis, Nathaniel 1755-1831
 http://www.boston-tea-party.org/participants/Nathaniel-Willis.html

1755 births
1831 deaths
American publishers (people)
Writers from Boston
18th century in Boston
People from Chillicothe, Ohio
People from Martinsburg, West Virginia
People from Winchester, Virginia
People from Shepherdstown, West Virginia
Editors of West Virginia newspapers
Farmers from Ohio
People of colonial Massachusetts
Journalists from Virginia
Journalists from Ohio